En Idhaya Rani is a 1993 Indian Tamil-language romantic drama film, directed by S. S. Vikram. The film stars Anand Babu, newcomer Geetharani, Chandrasekhar and Viji, with Charle, S. S. Chandran, Delhi Ganesh, Kovai Sarala and M. N. Rajam playing supporting roles. It was released on 5 February 1993.

Plot

The film starts with a bus full of mentally challenged women that has a flat tyre. The forest officer Sekhar (Chandrasekhar) comes to help them and changes their tyre, the bus then gets back on the road. Geetha (Geetharani), who is one of the mentally challenged women in the bus has been left out by the group. Having a lot of work to do, Sekhar cannot take care of Geetha, so he leaves her in a teacher's house. A few days later, Sekhar notices an advertisement in a newspaper that Geetha has disappeared. He then leaves Geetha with her father and her mother-in-law (M. N. Rajam). Her mother-in-law hates her and forces Sekhar to marry Geetha. Later, Sekhar and Geetha get married. Sekhar, who has a lot of work to finish, goes back to the forest. In the meantime, Geetha's jewels are stolen by one of her relatives and thieves go after her, she then gets hurt by getting hit by a car.

The driver is Chandrasekhar (Delhi Ganesh), a brain specialist doctor. He nurses Geetha back to health at his home, Geetha is no more a mentally ill person. Chandrasekhar, who lost his only daughter Rani in an aircraft accident, adopts her and names her Rani. Thereafter, the joyful Raja (Anand Babu) falls in love with Rani at first sight and they get married with Chandrasekhar's blessings. Afterwards, Raja becomes a forest officer and even captures a dreaded brigand. Many months later, Rani gives birth to a baby boy. In the meantime, Sekhar meets his old schoolmate Bhanu (Viji), who is still in love with him. Sekhar refuses to marry Bhanu and he still believes that Geetha will come back one day.

One day, Rani, her baby and Chandrasekhar take the train. Their train derailed and many people died. Rani's baby and Chandrasekhar are saved by the people, while Rani vanished. Chandrasekhar concluded that Rani died in the train wreck. Rani is in fact treated in a private hospital, but she has lost the last few years from her memory and she goes back to her parents' house. What transpires later forms the crux of the story.

Cast

Anand Babu as Raja
Geetharani as Geetha / Rani
Chandrasekhar as Sekhar
Viji as Bhanu
Charle as Vaigundam
S. S. Chandran
Delhi Ganesh as Chandrasekhar
Kovai Sarala as Kaveri
M. N. Rajam as Parvathi
Sharmili
Typist Gopu

Soundtrack

The soundtrack was composed by the film director S. S. Vikram. The soundtrack, released in 1993, features 6 tracks with lyrics written by  S. S. Vikram.

References

1993 films
1990s Tamil-language films
Indian romantic drama films
1993 romantic drama films